Akaal Bodhan is the worship of Durga—an incarnation of Devi—in the month of Ashwin, an uncustomary time for commencement of the worship.

Etymology
Both the words Akaal and Bodhan are Bengali words that descendant from Sanskrit word akālabodhana , which are also included in many other Indian languages, such as like Bengali. The word Akaal means untimed (kaal=time and a=not) and the word Bodhan means worship or invocation. Thus, Akaal Bodhan means worship or invocation of Durga in an uncustomary time. It is given this name since the period of this worship differs from the conventional period, which is during the spring (Boshonto).

Akaal Bodhan
In the Ramayana, Rama goes to Lanka to rescue his abducted wife, Sita, from the grip of Ravana, the king of the Demons in Lanka. Before starting for his battle with Ravana, Rama wanted the blessings of Devi Durga. He learned that the Goddess would be pleased only if she is worshipped with 108 Neel Kamal (blue lotuses). After travelling far flung places, Rama could gather only one hundred and seven of them. He finally decided to offer one of his eyes, which resembled blue lotuses. Durga, being pleased with the devotion of Rama, appeared before him and blessed him. Devi took the form of Chandi to kill demon brothers Chanda and Munda. Chanda and his brother Munda could not be killed in day time or at night so the Sandhi-kshna  was chosen to kill them (i.e., the crossover period between Ashtami [the next day] and Navami [the day after]). Ravana was killed on the tenth day, Dashami. Since the period of this worship was different from the conventional period, this puja is also known as Akal-Bodhan; a worship (Bodhan) in an unconventional time (A-Kaal).

See also
Durga Puja

References

Durga Puja
Shaktism